This list includes actual horses that exist in the historical record.  For fictional horses, see: List of fictional horses.

Racehorses

A
 Adios Butler: famous harness racer
 Affirmed: U.S. Triple Crown winner (1978)
 Ajax: 18 consecutive race wins, before he was defeated at 1/40
 Albatross: harness racer who won 59 of 71 races, and as a sire produced winners of over $130 million, including Niatross
 Allez France: French Arc winner and first filly to win a million dollars
 Alydar: finished second to Affirmed in all three 1978 Triple Crown races; successful sire 
 Almond Eye: Won 9 G1 races, including all three of the Japanese Fillies' Triple Crown in 2018 
 American Pharoah: 2015 winner of the U.S. Triple Crown and Breeders' Cup World Championships in Lexington, Kentucky at Keeneland Race Course
 Animal Kingdom: American Thoroughbred racehorse; won 137th Kentucky Derby and 2013 Dubai World Cup
 Apapane: 2010 Japanese Fillies' Triple Crown winner
 Archer: first and second winner of the Melbourne Cup 
 Aristides: winner of the first Kentucky Derby
 Arrogate: winner of Travers Stakes, Breeders' Cup Classic, Pegasus World Cup, and Dubai World Cup in track record time and the richest U.S.-based racehorse of all time
 Arkle: highest Timeform rating for a steeplechase horseracer
 Assault: U.S. Triple Crown winner (1946)

B
 Barbaro: American Thoroughbred who decisively won the 2006 Kentucky Derby, but shattered his leg two weeks later in the 2006 Preakness Stakes, ending his racing career; underwent several operations; eventually healed, but developed laminitis and could not be saved; euthanized January 29, 2007
 Beholder: three-time winner of the Breeders' Cup Distaff, as well as the first filly to win the Pacific Classic 
 Bernborough: Australian racehorse and winner of 15 consecutive races at big weights; sold to US film producer Louis B. Mayer
 Ben Nevis: champion Maryland steeplechaser he won the Maryland Hunt Cup twice and the Grand National
 Bend Or, very successful British Thoroughbred racehorse who won the 1880 Epsom Derby
 Best Mate: 2002, 2003 and 2004 Cheltenham Gold Cup winner; often given title 'Greatest Steeplechaser' since Arkle, and an equal to him
 Big Brown: 2008 Kentucky Derby and Preakness Stakes winner; first horse since Clyde Van Dusen to win the Kentucky Derby from the 20th post position
 Black Caviar: undefeated in 25 career starts; fifteen-time Group 1 winner
 Bold Forbes: 1976 Kentucky Derby and Belmont Stakes winner
 Bold Ruler: leading sire of stakeswinners; born in the same barn the same night as Round Table; sired the outstanding Secretariat
 Brian's Time: American-trained racehorse with a successful stud career in Japan
 Bret Hanover: one of only nine pacers to win the Triple Crown of Harness Racing for Pacers; had 62 wins from 69 starts; the only horse to be made Harness Horse of the Year three times
 Brigadier Gerard: winner of 17 of 18 races in England, including the 2000 Guineas and 11 other Group I races; joint third highest Timeform flat rating of all time
 Brooklyn Supreme: a red roan Belgian stallion noted for his extreme size
 Bucephalus: Horse of Alexander the Great
 Buckpasser: won 15 consecutive races; one of the great broodmare sires

C
 California Chrome: won the 140th Kentucky Derby; won the Preakness; won the 2016 Dubai World Cup; two-time American Horse of the Year
 Carbine: outstanding racehorse and sire; winner of the Melbourne Cup
 Cardigan Bay: New Zealand's "million dollar pacer"; the first to win a million in the US; appeared on The Ed Sullivan Show
 Castleshane: winner of eight flat races and two jumps
 Cicero: winner of the 1905 Epsom Derby as the shortest-priced successful favourite in the history of the event
 Cigar: champion in the 1990s who won 16 consecutive races
 Citation: U.S. Triple Crown winner (1948); also won 16 consecutive major stakes races; first horse to earn $1 million\
 Contrail: 2020 Japanese Triple Crown winner
 Country House: Winner of Kentucky Derby 2019 after Maximum Security was demoted from 1st place for interference with other horses
 Crisp: remembered for his epic race in the Grand National with Red Rum
 Curlin: third richest US-based horse of all time, winner of 2007 Preakness Stakes and Breeders' Cup Classic and 2008 Dubai World Cup

D
 Dan Patch: America's greatest pacer
 Danehill: American-bred and British-trained sprint champion who went on to become a champion sire in both the northern and southern hemispheres; the first major "shuttle stallion" 
 Dance Smartly: second Canadian filly ever to win the Canadian Triple Crown, and the first to win a Breeders Cup Race
 Dawn Run: only horse ever to complete Champion Hurdle, Cheltenham Gold Cup double
 Deep Impact: Japanese Triple Crown winner; also smashed the world record over 3200 metres and seven-time leading sire in Japan
 Desert Gold: race mare who won 19 races successive races during World War I; often raced against Gloaming
 Desert Orchid: won King George four times and Cheltenham Gold Cup
 Dr. Fager: "the Doctor"; set the world record at 1 mile on any surface, 1:32 1/5, and held it for more than 20 years
 Doncaster: very successful racehorse, sire of the great Bend Or

E
 Easy Goer: Hall of Fame champion who ran the fastest mile of all time on dirt by any three-year-old Thoroughbred in 1:32.2; ran the second fastest Belmont Stakes of all time behind Secretariat; had a great rivalry with Sunday Silence
 Eclipse: celebrated 18th-century racehorse that won 18 races in 18 starts; influential sire
 Eight Belles: first filly to win the Martha Washington Stakes, by a record 13½ lengths
 Exterminator: exceedingly popular "iron horse" of American racing history

F
 Frankel: undefeated in 14 career starts; highest rated flat race horse in history: WTR 140; Timeform 147, Racing Post 143
 Funny Cide: first gelding since Clyde Van Dusen to win the Kentucky Derby
 Flyingbolt: widely considered as the second best Steeplechaser of all-time; stablemate of Arkle; Timeform rated 210. 2 lb inferior to Arkle
 Fair Play: successful American Thoroughbred racehorse and very successful sire; sired the great Man o' War

G
 Gainsborough: winner of the English Triple Crown; leading sire
 Galileo: seven-time Leading sire in Great Britain & Ireland; sire of Frankel; has sired 102 Group 1 winners worldwide as of December 2015
 Gentildonna: Japanese Fillies' Triple Crown winner of 2012 and two time winner of the Japan Cup (2012, 2013)
 Genuine Risk: second filly to win the Kentucky Derby (1980)
 Gloaming: won 19 successive races in New Zealand and Australia; record was 67 starts for 57 wins and 9 seconds
 Go Man Go: champion running Quarter Horse
 Golden Miller: record five-time winner of the Cheltenham Gold Cup; only horse to win the Cheltenham Gold Cup and Grand National in the same year
 Goldsmith Maid: famous harness racing mare of the 19th century
 Greyhound: named Trotting Horse of the Century in the US

H
 Hambletonian 10: the "father of American trotting"
 Haru Urara: Became  as she never won a single race in her career.
 Hurricane Fly: Irish hurdler, winner of a record 22 Grade I races
 Hyperion: winner of The Derby and the St Leger Stakes; top sire for six years in the UK
 Hastings: sire of Fair Play, who in turn sired the great Man o' War, successful racehorse

I
 Incitatus: horse legend says Roman Emperor Caligula planned to make a senator
 Iroquois: first American-bred racehorse to win The Derby
 Invasor: winner of the Uruguayan Triple Crown, as well as the Dubai World Cup and Breeders' Cup Classic
 I'll Have Another: winner of the 2012 Kentucky Derby and Preakness Stakes
 Irish War Cry: Graded-Stakes Winner, noted for his win in the Wood Memorial Stakes and for finishing second in the 2017 Belmont Stakes
 Isinglass: sixth winner of the English Triple Crown (1892)
 Isonomy: very successful racehorse and sire of The English Triple Crown winner Isinglass

J
 Jay Trump: three-time winner of the Maryland Hunt Cup and the Grand National
 John Henry: U.S. Champion Turf Horse (1980, 1981, 1983, 1984)
 Johnstown: winner of the 1939 Kentucky Derby and Belmont Stakes
 Justify: 2018 winner of the U.S. Triple Crown
 Just A Way: Won the Dubai Duty Free in 2014 at a record time still undefeated as of 2023, becoming the best rated horse that year as a result.

K
 Kelso: only five-time U.S. Horse of the Year, in the list of the top 100 U.S. thoroughbred champions of the 20th Century by The Blood-Horse magazine, Kelso ranks 4th
 Kincsem: Hungarian race mare and most successful racehorse ever, winning all 54 starts in five countries
 Kindergarten: weighted more than Phar Lap in the Melbourne Cup
 Kingston: all-time record holder of the most wins by a horse with 89
 Kingston Town: won three Cox Plates; first Australian horse to top $1million in stakes earnings
 King Kamehameha: Successful race horse and sire in Japan.
 Kissin George: one of America's premier sprinting Thoroughbred racehorses
 Kitasan Black: Won 7 Grade 1 races in Japan, owned by famous enka singer Saburo Kitajima

L
 La Troienne: most important broodmare of the twentieth century
 Lexington: America's leading 19th-century sire
 Longfellow: 19th-century runner and stallion
 Lonesome Glory: only five-time winner of American champion steeplechaser 
 Lottery: winner of the Grand National steeplechase in 1839
 Lookin At Lucky: winner of 2010 Preakness Stakes, sired Lookin at Lee

M
 Makybe Diva: won the Melbourne Cup on three occasions
 Man o' War: often considered America's greatest racehorse; won 20 of 21 career starts
 Marengo Famous war horse of Napoleon
 Master Charlie: winner of the 1924 Remsen Stakes, Tijuana Futurity, Hopeful Stakes, Kentucky Jockey Club Stakes; awarded 1924 American Champion Two-Year-Old-Male/Colt
 Maximum Security: Winner of Kentucky Derby 2019 before disqualification from 1st place for disturbing other horses
 Mejiro McQueen: Two time winner of the Tenno Sho (spring), among other Grade 1 victories
 Might and Power: World Champion Stayer (1997); Australian Horse of the Year (1998, 1999)
 Milton: (16 February 1977 – 4 July 1999) Showjumping gelding that competed for Great Britain with John Whitaker and won several championships in his career.
 Mr. Prospector: one of the most successful U.S. sires of the late 20th century
 Moifaa: first New Zealand horse to win the Grand National
 Mahubah: dam of Man o' War

N
 Narita Brian: 1994 Japanese Triple Crown winner
 Nasrullah: one of the most successful Thoroughbred sires of the 20th century, grandsire to Secretariat
 Native Dancer (also nicknamed the Grey Ghost): won 21 of 22 career races, with only loss in the Kentucky Derby; sire whose descendants have come to dominate modern Triple Crown racing
Nearco Italian bred Thoroughbred racehorse. ''Thoroughbred Heritage'' described him as  "one of the greatest racehorses of the Twentieth Century" and "one of the most important sires of the century." He was undefeated and his sire line was dominant.
 Needles: the first Florida-bred horse to win the Kentucky Derby (1956), also won the Belmont Stakes
 Niatross: pacer who won 37 of his 39 races and broke many records, considered to be one of the greatest harness racers of all time
 Night Raid: sire of Phar Lap
 Nijinsky: last horse to win the English Triple Crown (1970)
 Northern Dancer: Canada's champion on the racetrack; most successful sire of the 20th century

O 
 Oedipus: winner of the American Steeplechase triple crown
 Oguri Cap: JRA Hall of Fame inductee; winner of many G1 races and ushered in an era of heightened popularity of the sport during his racing career
 Oju Chosan: Steeplechase race horse who won numerous JG1 races, most notably winning the Nakayama Grand Jump for 5 times in a row.
 Orfevre: winner of almost 20 million US dollars in earnings and is one of the highest earning racehorses ever
 Overdose: champion Hungarian sprinter and winner of 14 straight races

P
 Peter Pan: winner of the Preakness Stakes, and had the Peter Pan Stakes named in his honor
 Phar Lap: Australia and New Zealand's most famed Thoroughbred racehorse; won 37 of his 51 career starts
 Pleasant Colony: 1981 Kentucky Derby and Preakness Stakes winner
 Potoooooooo: 18th-century thoroughbred racehorse who won over 30 races and defeated some of the greatest racehorses of the time.
Pretty Polly Irish Thoroughbred racehorse who won 15 consecutive races, fifth filly to win the British Fillies Triple Crown, record 24: 22-2-0

Q 
 Quevega: only horse in the history to win at six consecutive Cheltenham Festivals
 Queensway: won the Canadian Triple Crown

R
 Rachel Alexandra: filly and winner of the 2009 Preakness Stakes
 Rakwool: Australian bay gelding, won the 1931 Grand National Steeplechase
 Roy Olcott: harness racehorse
 Real Quiet: winner of the 1998 Kentucky Derby and Preakness Stakes; lost the third leg of the U.S. Triple Crown, the Belmont Stakes, by a margin of four inches
 Red Rum: only horse in the history of the Aintree Grand National to win the race three times (placed second on two other occasions)
 Regret: first filly to win the Kentucky Derby (1915)
 Ribot: Thoroughbred undefeated in sixteen races
 Rice Shower: Winner of the 1992 Kikka Sho and two-time Tenno Sho winner; euthanized after breaking his leg during the 1995 Takarazuka Kinen
 Rock Sand: English Triple Crown winner (1903); sire of the dam of Man o' War
 Round Table: sire of stakes winners; born in the same barn the same night as Bold Ruler, in 1954
 Ruffian: filly champion who won every race she started until her final (and fatal) race
 Ruthless: first ever winner of the Belmont Stakes, and the first of only three fillies ever to win the Belmont Stakes

S
 Sadler's Wells: one of Europe's most successful sires of the late 20th century
 Sardar: stallion presented as a gift to First Lady Jacqueline Kennedy by President Ayub Khan on her visit to Pakistan
 Sea Bird: second highest Timeform rated horse (rated 145)
 Sea the Stars: first horse ever to win the 2,000 Guineas, Epsom Derby, and Arc de Triomphe in the same year (2009)
 Seabiscuit: beat War Admiral in a nationally broadcast 1938 match race; like Phar Lap, raced during the Depression
 Seattle Slew: U.S. Triple Crown winner (1977)
 Secretariat: U.S. Triple Crown winner (1973); one of the most famous horses in Thoroughbred racing
 Sham: The main competitor to Secretariat during the 1973 racing season
 Shergar: winner of the 1981 Epsom Derby by a record 10 lengths, the longest winning margin in a race run annually since 1781; kidnapped by the IRA in 1983, and was held for ransom, but the owner syndicate refused to pay, fearing that valuable horses would become targets; the stallion was never found
 Shinzan: Japanese Triple Crown winner of 1964.
 Silence Suzuka: Winner of the 1998 Takarazuka Kinen whose legs broke in the Tenno Sho that same year, leading to his untimely euthanization.
 Silky Sullivan: a racehorse
 Sir Winston: Winner of 2019 Belmont Stakes
 Skewball: immortalized in 18th century poetry as a sku-ball winning against a Thoroughbred
 Smarty Jones: became the first unbeaten Kentucky Derby winner since Seattle Slew in 1977
 Spectacular Bid: Hall of Fame champion who went undefeated as a four-year-old, and won 26 of 30 career starts
 Stay Gold: Dubbed "the Silver Collector" during his racing career; goes on to sire Orfevre, Gold Ship, and Oju Chosan
 Steel Dust: 19th-century quarter-mile racing horse
 Still in Love: 2003 Japanese Fillies' Triple Crown winner
 Storm Cat: one of the most successful U.S. sires of the late 20th century
 St. Simon: Undefeated British racehorse and successful sire
 Sunday Silence: winner in the US; champion sire in Japan
 Sunline: first Southern Hemisphere horse to top $10million in stakes earnings; three-time Australian (2000-2002); four-time New Zealand Horse of the Year (1999-2002); 13-time Group 1 winner
 Swale: 1984 Kentucky Derby and Belmont Stakes winner, died eight days after the Belmont win
 Symboli Rudolf: Winner of the 1984 Japanese Triple Crown.

T 
 Taiki Shuttle: JRA Hall of Fame inductee, two-time Yasuda Kinen winner and the first Japanese-trained horse to win the Prix Jacques Le Marois.
 Tanya: second filly ever to win the Belmont Stakes
 Tapwrit: won the 2017 Belmont Stakes, and set a new stakes record for the Tampa Bay Derby
 Ta Wee: two-time American Champion Sprint Horse, and won her second Fall Highweight Handicap, at 10 stone (140 pounds) and her second Interborough Handicap, at 10 stone 2 pounds (142 pounds)
 The Duke: first and second winner of the Grand National
 The General: Owned by the 10th United States president, John Tyler
 The Minstrel: winner of the Derby, Irish Derby and King George VI and Queen Elizabeth Stakes
Tiznow: two-time winner of the Breeders' Cup Classic
T M Opera O: Became the Japanese Horse of the Year for the 2000 season after he went undefeated in all 8 races that he participated in, becoming the highest earning racehorse at the time in the process.
Tokai Teio: Japanese Horse of the Year of 1991.
Tonalist: winner of 2014 Belmont Stakes, and two-time winner of the Jockey Club Gold Cup
 Tuscalee: steeplechaser and all-time record holder for most wins in a season, and for most steeplechase wins overall
 Twenty Grand: winner of the Kentucky Derby, Belmont, and Travers Stakes, also was champion 3-year-old and Horse of the Year of 1931 
 Two Lea: successful broodmare and filly winner of the Hollywood Gold Cup

U 
 Unbreakable: grandsire of great Native Dancer
 Unbridled: winner of the Kentucky Derby and Breeders' Cup Classic and sire of the champion sire Unbridled's Song
 Unbridled's Song: Breeders' Cup Juvenile winner, and sire of the great Arrogate

V
 Vain: champion front runner; great, great grandsire of Black Caviar
 Varenne: Italy's most famous harness horse
 Vodka: First filly in 64 years to win the Tokyo Yushun (Japanese Derby) in 2007
 Vo Rouge: fast frontrunner and 3-time winner of the C F Orr Stakes, had the Vo Rogue Plate named in his honor
 Voltaire: winner of the 1828 Doncaster Gold Cup
 Voltigeur: Won the Derby and the St Leger in 1850 and beat The Flying Dutchman in the Doncaster Cup. In 1851 Voltigeur was beaten by The Flying Dutchman in what was probably the most celebrated match race in the history of British thoroughbred racing.

W
 War Admiral: fourth U.S. Triple Crown winner (1937)
 War of Will: Winner of 2019 Preakness Stakes
 Whistlejacket: Marquess of Rockingham's racehorse; painted by G. Stubbs (1762)
 Winning Colors: third filly to win the Kentucky Derby (1988)
 Winx: winner of 33 straight races, including the Cox Plate four times
 Wise Dan: two-time American Horse of the Year (2012, 2013); won Breeders' Cup Mile twice (same years)
 Whirlaway: fifth American Triple Crown winner 
 Whisk Broom II: first of four horses ever to win the New York Handicap Triple

X 
 Xaar: winner of Prix de Cabourg (1997), Prix de la Salamandre (1997)
 Xtra Heat: champion 3-year-old filly of 2001, and the only filly to win the Endine stakes twice

Y 
 Yeats: only horse ever to win 4 Ascot Gold Cups, also won 3 other group 1 races
 Your Host: winner of 1950 Santa Anita Derby, 1951 Santa Catalina Handicap, sire of the great Kelso

Z
 Zabeel: New Zealand sire of Octagonal and Vengeance of Rain
 Zaccio: three-time winner of the Outstanding Steeplechase horse award in the 80s
 Zenyatta: won 19 of 20 starts; first mare to win the Breeders' Cup Classic (2009); first to win two different Breeders' Cup races (Ladies' Classic in 2008, Classic in 2009)
 Zev: winner of the Belmont Stakes and the Kentucky Derby, as well as winner of a match race against Epsom Derby winner Papyrus 
 Zippy Chippy: infamous for racing 100 times and losing every single time

Competition horses
 Big Ben, Canadian international show jumper and Olympian
 Hickstead, Canadian international show jumper and Olympic individual show jumping gold medal winner
 Huaso (1933 – August 24, 1961), famous Chilean jumping horse that still holds the record in highest jump: 2.47 m (8 ft  in)
Midnight inducted into five different halls of fame, this bucking horse famously bucked at the best rodeos throughout the West and Canada
Midnight Sun, two-time Grand Champion and leading foundation sire of the Tennessee Walking Horse breed
 Milton, British international show jumper and Olympian ridden by John Whitaker
 Noble Flaire, Morgan horse who was the first to win three Park Harness World Championships at the American Morgan Horse World Championship Horse Show
 Radium, outstanding campdrafter; influential sire in Australia
Scamper, ProRodeo Hall of Fame horse in barrel racing for hall of fame rider Charmayne James. They won the National Finals Rodeo a consecutive 10 times in a row, a record that still stands today.
 Seldom Seen, pony who successfully competed in dressage despite being unusually small
 Snowman, former plough horse rescued by rider Harry de Lyer from being butchered; won the 1958 National Horse Show Open Jumper championship against professional and Olympic level competition; twice named the American Horse Shows Association Horse of the Year
 Totilas, first horse to score above a 90 in dressage
 Touch of Class, bay TB mare, ridden by Joe Fargis, won two gold medals in the 1984 Olympics
 Valegro, current world record holder in dressage with 94,3% Royal Dutch Sport Horse, ridden by Charlotte Dujardin

Military horses

 Babieca, horse of El Cid
 Black Jack, the last Quartermaster-issued U.S. Army horse, died February 6, 1976
 Blueskin, one of Washington's two primary mounts during the American Revolutionary War
 Bucephalus, favorite horse of Alexander the Great; one of the most famous horses of antiquity; following his death after the Battle of Hydaspes in 326 BCE, Alexander promptly founded the city of Bucephala upon the spot in his memory
 Chetak, war horse of Rana Pratap of Mewar in India; died defending its master in 1576 during the Battle of Haldighati
 Cincinnati, one of Ulysses S. Grant's horses
 Comanche, only documented survivor of General Custer's 7th Cavalry detachment at the Battle of Little Big Horn
 Copenhagen, the Duke of Wellington's favourite horse, which he rode at the Battle of Waterloo
 Dhūljānāḥ, the horse of Husayn ibn Ali in the Battle of Karbala
 Favorito, the personal horse of Charles Albert of Savoy, King of Sardinia from 1831 to the king’s death in 1849
 Kasztanka, horse of Józef Piłsudski, likely the most famous Polish horse
 Llamrei, horse of King Arthur
 Marengo, Napoleon's horse which was captured by the British, and outlived Napoleon by eight years
 Matsukaze, personal horse of Maeda Keiji
 Nelson, one of Washington's two primary mounts during the American Revolutionary War
 Palomo, main horse of Simon Bolivar
 Reckless, became a decorated Marine for carrying supplies and ammunition into battle for the US Marine platoon in the Korean War
 Red Hare, also known as Chitu, Lü Bu's horse from the Three Kingdoms; inspired the phrase "Among men: Lü Bu. Among horses: Red Hare"
 Sefton, survivor of the Hyde Park and Regent's Park bombings in 1982
 Streiff, horse of Gustavus Adolphus of Sweden at the battle of Lützen (1632)
 Tencendur, warhorse of King Charlemagne
 Traveller, Robert E. Lee's horse
 Veillantif, horse of Roland, a Frankish military leader under Charlemagne
 Warrior, "Old Warrior", the mount of General Jack Seely in the First World War from 1914 to 1918; awarded the Dickin Medal in 2014

Horses of various other fame
 Bamboo Harvester, portrayed a talking horse in the title role of the TV series Mister Ed, retired in Shasta County
 Brooklyn Supreme, said to be the largest horse in history
 Burmese, favourite mount of Queen Elizabeth II; a gift from the Royal Canadian Mounted Police
 Buttermilk, Dale Evans' horse
 Champion, Gene Autry's horse
 Clever Hans, a smart horse
 Darley Arabian, Godolphin Arabian and Byerly Turk, stallions from whom all Thoroughbreds are descended
 Figure (also known by the name of one of his owners, Justin Morgan), the foundation sire of the Morgan horse breed
 Gun Rock, the offspring of Man O' War used in the 1920s at UC Davis to breed horses for the U.S. Army Cavalry
 Hollywood Dun It, all-time leading reining sire and Quarter Horse
 Huaso, Chilean-bred horse; holder of the high jump world record set in Chile on February 5 of 1949, one of the world's longest unbroken sport records
 Incitatus, Emperor Caligula's favorite horse; may have been made a senator
 Jim, former milk cart horse used to produce diphtheria antitoxin; contamination of this antitoxin inspired the Biologics Control Act of 1902
 King, a foundation sire of the Quarter Horse breed
 Marocco or Bankes's Horse, a late 16th- and early 17th-century English performing horse
 Muhamed, German horse allegedly capable of solving cubic roots
 Old Bob, Abraham Lincoln's horse
 Popcorn Deelites, the main horse who played Seabiscuit in the Oscar Nominated film Seabiscuit 
 Prometea, born May 28, 2003, the first cloned horse and the first to be born from and carried by its cloning mother
 Rugged Lark, famous quarter horse owned by Carol Harris, in the American Quarter Horse Hall of Fame
 Sampson, the tallest horse ever recorded; a Shire; stood 21.2½ hands high
 Thunder, Red Ryder's horse
 Traveler, mascot of the University of Southern California
 Trigger, Roy Rogers' Palomino
 Warpaint, mascot of the NFL Kansas City Chiefs
 Zippo Pine Bar Inducted into American Quarter Horse Hall of Fame and National Snaffle Bit Association Hall of Fame

See also
 List of fictional horses
 List of horses of the American Civil War
 List of leading Thoroughbred racehorses
 American Horse of the Year
 Equine recipients of the Dickin Medal
 Wonder Horses
 Horses of Elizabeth II
 Horsemanship of Ulysses S. Grant

References

Historical horses
Historical
Historical horses
Horses